Protea inopina, the large-nut sugarbush, is a flowering shrub belonging to the well-known Protea genus. The plant is endemic to the Western Cape, rare, extremely isolated and occurs only in the Olifants River mountains near Palace Hill.

Description
The plant grows 1 m tall and has many stems. It blooms from September to December. The plant sprouts again after it has burned. The seeds are stored in a shell and spread by the wind. The plant is unisexual. Pollination takes place through the action of birds. The plant grows in sandstone soil at altitudes of 600 - 650 m.

See also
 List of Protea species

References

inopina
Flora of the Cape Provinces
Taxa named by John Patrick Rourke